Sir Paul Benedict Crossland Carter  is a British Conservative local government politician, serving as a councillor in Kent County Council, which he led for 14 years from 2005 until the end of 2019, and as the chair of the County Councils Network special-interest group within the Local Government Association from 2015 until 2020.

Carter was appointed Commander of the Order of the British Empire (CBE) in the 2014 New Year Honours. He was knighted in the 2020 Birthday Honours for services to local government.

Offices held

References 

Living people
Councillors in Kent
Knights Bachelor
Politicians awarded knighthoods
Commanders of the Order of the British Empire
Year of birth missing (living people)